The 2012 2000 Guineas Stakes was the 204th running of the 2000 Guineas Stakes horse race. It was run over one mile at Newmarket Racecourse on 5 May 2013.

Race details
 Sponsor: QIPCO
 Winner's prize money: £226,840
 Going: Good to Sirm
 Number of runners: 18
 Winner's time: 1 minute, 42.46 seconds

Full result

* The distances between the horses are shown in lengths or shorter – nk = neck

Winner details
Further details of the winner, Camelot:

 Foaled: 5 March 2009, in Great Britain
 Sire: Montjeu; Dam: Hymn Of The Dawn (Kingmambo)
 Owner: Derrick Smith, Mrs John Magnier, Michael Tabor
 Breeder: Abdullah bin Hamad bin Isa Al Khalifa

Form analysis

Two-year-old races
Notable runs by the future 2000 Guineas participants as two-year-olds in 2011:
 Camelot - 1st Racing Post Trophy
 French Fifteen - 2nd Prix Thomas Bryon, 1st Critérium International
 Trumpet Major - 2nd Winkfield Stakes, 1st Champagne Stakes
 Coupe De Ville - 1st Stonehenge Stakes
 Fencing - 1st Washington Singer Stakes, 3rd Racing Post Trophy
 Ptolemaic - 2nd Silver Tankard Stakes
 Abtaal - 1st Prix Thomas Bryon
 Caspar Netscher - 3rd Windsor Castle Stakes, 2nd Rose Bowl Stakes, 3rd Richmond Stakes, 1st Gimcrack Stakes, 1st Mill Reef Stakes 
 Redact - 2nd Mill Reef Stakes 
 Red Duke - 1st Superlative Stakes, 2nd Vintage Stakes
 Born To Sea - 2nd Killavullan Stakes
 Boomerang Bob - 2nd Norfolk Stakes, 2nd Prix du Bois
 Saigon - 1st Rose Bowl Stakes, 3rd Sirenia Stakes, 3rd Mill Reef Stakes, 2nd Horris Hill Stakes
 Bronterre - 1st Stardom Stakes, 4th Dewhurst Stakes
 Power - 1st Marble Hill Stakes, 1st Coventry Stakes, 2nd Phoenix Stakes, 1st National Stakes, 2nd Dewhurst Stakes
 Talwar - 1st Winkfield Stakes, 1st Solario Stakes

The road to Newmarket
Early-season appearances in 2012, prior to running in the 2000 Guineas:

 French Fifteen – 1st Prix Djebel
 Hermival - 3rd Prix Djebel
 Trumpet Major - 1st Craven Stakes
 Ptolemaic - 4th Craven Stakes
 Abtaal - 2nd Prix Djebel
 Caspar Netscher - 1st Greenham Stakes
 Red Duke - 5th UAE Derby
 Boomerang Bob - 2nd Greenham Stakes
 Bronterre - 3rd Greenham Stakes
 Talwar - 1st International Trial Stakes

Subsequent Group 1 wins
Group 1 / Grade I victories after running in the 2000 Guineas:
 Camelot – Epsom Derby, Irish Derby (2012)
 Power - Irish 2,000 Guineas (2012)

Subsequent breeding careers
Leading progeny of participants in the 2012 2000 Guineas.

Sires of Classic winners
Camelot (1st)
 Latrobe - 1st Irish Derby (2018)
 Even So - 1st Irish Oaks (2020)
 Athena - 1st Belmont Oaks (2018)
 Sir Erec - 1st Spring Juvenile Hurdle (2019)

Sires of Group/Grade One winners
French Fifteen (2nd)
 French King- 1st Grosser Preis von Berlin (2019)
 Sestilio Jet - 1st Prix de Saint-Georges (2019)

Other Stallions
Born To Sea (12th) - Sea Of Grace (2nd Poule d'Essai des Pouliches 2017)Hermival (3rd) - Minor flat runner - exported to MoroccoCaspar Netscher (9th) - Minor flat runner before returning to training after proving subfertile

References

2000 Guineas
2000 Guineas
2000 Guineas
2000 Guineas
2010s in Suffolk
2000 Guineas Stakes